Iván Castellani (born 19 January 1991) is an Argentine volleyball player. A member of the Argentina men's national volleyball team, he was a participant at the 2012 Summer Olympics in London.

life

Career
He played for Montpellier UC for only a few months because he was unhappy with the coaching staff. In January 2014, he moved to the Italian team Pallavolo Molfetta.

Sporting achievements

National team
 2010  Pan-American Cup
 2011  Pan American Games

References

External links

 FIVB profile
 LegaVolley player profile

1991 births
Italian emigrants to Argentina
Living people
Volleyball players from Buenos Aires
Argentine men's volleyball players
Olympic volleyball players of Argentina
Volleyball players at the 2012 Summer Olympics
Naturalized citizens of Argentina
Volleyball players at the 2011 Pan American Games
Pan American Games bronze medalists for Argentina
Pan American Games medalists in volleyball
Medalists at the 2011 Pan American Games